This is a non-exhaustive listing of former bus interchanges or terminals that were once part of Singapore's bus system, and decommissioned due to geographical retention or the introduction of new town centres, or creation of consolidated transportation hubs.

Former bus interchanges

Woodlands
Woodlands Bus Interchange is a former bus interchange that was located at Woodlands Town Centre. Initially planned in the late 1970s as part of a bus service improvement scheme, the interchange started operations in 1981, and had 17 berths. The announcement to build the North-South Line MRT extension and the Woodlands MRT station that was scheduled to complete and open on 10 February 1996, accelerated plans to relocate and develop an entirely new town centre for Woodlands New Town at Woodlands Square, the new regional centre for Woodlands or more precisely, the North region. In late-1996, electronic display boards of TIBS buses serving the Woodlands Bus Interchange began to display notices that the TIBS Woodlands' fleet would be moving to the new interchange at Woodlands Square, Singapore's first mass underground bus interchange – Woodlands Regional Bus Interchange, conveniently located under the Woodlands MRT station, and is connected to Causeway Point with escalators. Woodlands Regional Bus Interchange was closed on 12 March 2016 for upgrading works as part of the construction of Thomson-East Coast Line Woodlands station and was temporarily replaced by Woodlands Temporary Bus Interchange. The interchange reopened as part of the Woodlands Integrated Transport Hub on 13 June 2021.

Hougang South

Hougang South Bus Interchange was a bus interchange, located in Hougang Street 21, which ceased operations on 15 February 2004. The interchange's structure continues to stand pending a major redevelopment of the site, and is currently called Kovan Hub. 

Initially named Hougang Bus Interchange, construction of the interchange commenced in 1981, and it commenced operations in October 1983, with an exhibition held prior to the interchange's opening to get commuters accustomed to it. Fitted out with 34 bus bays, the interchange was built to handle additional bus services with the further development of Hougang new town. 

At that time, Hougang comprised just four neighbourhoods, with large tracts to the northwest of Upper Serangoon Road still undeveloped. The commercial centre at Hougang Street 21 thus served as a town centre. From the 1990s, however, the town was rapidly expanded with five more neighbourhoods constructed, and a new, permanent town centre further north was built. As is the case for all other bus interchanges (except the Eunos Bus Interchange) in which they are located in their respective town centres, the Hougang Bus Interchange was to be moved to the new town centre, while the existing facility was then converted to other uses. Its bus services were then amended to terminate at either Hougang Central or Punggol.

When this plan was publicised, it created an uproar amongst the local populace, particularly shopowners in Hougang Street 21. With the help of local politicians, their discontentments were made to the relevant authorities, resulting in a delay in the interchange's closure. The government was adamant on removing the interchange, however, as it insists it makes little sense to have two bus interchanges in one town, and the opening of the Kovan MRT station on the North East Line will help to continue bringing in the crowds. It proceeded to build a new, permanent interchange, known as the Hougang Central Bus Interchange, and renamed the existing interchange as the Hougang South Bus Interchange.

In the meantime, the vacated facility does occasionally hold atrium exhibitions and for other commercial uses. It is now converted into a community space with an open carpark on the former end-on berths. It also serves as a transit stop for coaches to and from Malaysia with routes from destinations such as Genting Highlands and Kuala Lumpur. Moreover, bus services 112, 113 and 119 still calls at the facility for passengers to alight and disembark there as a bus stop at the former sawtooth berths. Service 115 starts its journey from there and Service 53M layovers at the bus stop.

Jurong
Jurong Bus Interchange was a bus interchange in Singapore, located at the junction of Jalan Ahmad Ibrahim and Jurong Port Road. It was completed in 1978 at a cost of S$1.2 million, and was the first bus station in Singapore built to serve feeder services, which were then being introduced as part of a rationalisation plan by Singapore Bus Service.

After it ceased operations in 1990, it functioned as a bus depot in the western part of Singapore before it was demolished when SBS Transit built a new multi storey bus depot (Soon Lee Bus Park) along Soon Lee Road in the Jurong Industrial Area. Some services went to Boon Lay, or cut back to Jurong East and Clementi respectively.

Former bus terminals

Jalan Kayu
Jalan Kayu Bus terminal was once served by Service 103 and 163 with its extension in the 1970s. In the 1980s, Services 214E and 214W was introduced to serve the nearby areas of Piccadilly and West Camp Road. These services were later renamed to Service 820 and 821 in 1999 after operations handed over to SBST. These services were then withdrawn under the Phase 3 of North East MRT Line Rationalisation with the introduction of Service 103 and 103W. Service 163 was extended to Sengkang Int in 2002 and later in 2003, Service 103 was then converted to a single suffix and made to loop around Piccadilly after the terminal’s closure. The main bus bay was converted to a public carpark on 7 December 2003 and was demolished in the late-2000s.

Marine Parade
Marine Parade Bus Terminal was a bus terminal that served the Marine Parade and East Coast areas. It was constructed by the Singapore Bus Service in 1981 at a cost of $500,000, as part of its plan to eliminate roadside bus terminals. The terminal also allowed for more bus services to serve the Marine Parade area. However, the terminal's construction was opposed by residents of nearby housing estates due to concerns over noise pollution. Consequently, SBS noted that the terminal would be "tastefully designed and properly landscaped", and the site was at least 220 metres away from the nearest housing estate.

When the land plot was slated as the new site of Victoria School, the terminal was demolished to make way. Old routes of Service 16, 55, 135, 155 that used to terminate there were made to make a loop around the school site. The former site of the roadside terminal is now replaced with a bus stop and Service 36 and 401 serves the area today.

Before the terminal shifted to its former site in the 1980s, it was located at Marine Terrace within the Marine Parade housing estate. There were Services 15, 16 and 211. Service 15 former routing merged into the current Service 196, Service 16 remains today being extended to Siglap Road and later extended once more to absorb CSS 608 routing to Bedok while Service 211 was a feeder service to Katong which was withdrawn on 5 March 1989.

Marsiling
Marsiling Bus Terminal was the original bus terminal serving the entire north of Singapore, which was predominantly undeveloped and neglected in the course of developing the country's suburb throughout the 1960s till the 1980s. Development of this area started to sprout when former-Deputy Prime Minister Tony Tan (who later became President of the Republic of Singapore) became the MP for Sembawang, and pledged to develop Sembawang into a prosperous suburb. This allowed for the creation of the Woodlands New Town and the entire extension of Woodlands from the original old town centre at Woodlands Centre Road and the integration of Marsiling, a small estate of only around 20 4-storeys HDB blocks, into the new town.

Woodlands New Town was speedily developing in the mid-1980s and first plans to build an entirely new bus interchange to replace the relatively small Marsiling Bus Terminal surfaces after Woodlands become part of the new Sembawang GRC in 1988. By the mid-1990s, the Woodlands Bus Interchange based at Woodlands Centre Road was fully functional. Marsiling Bus Terminal continued operations with Services 950, 951, 952 with Service 950 plying the route to Shenton Way, Service 951 to Boon Lay and Service 952 to Marina Centre, were periodically moved to the new bus interchange. The closure of the bus terminal comes as TIBS axed the 95x services, in favour of the new 96x services that served the downtown city areas.

New Bridge Road
New Bridge Road Bus Terminal was a bus terminal in Eu Tong Sen Street, near to Chinatown and Singapore General Hospital in Singapore. It was opened on 6 June 1987 and was near to Outram Park MRT station. This bus terminal had an alighting berth after the entrance of the bus park. No boarding facilities were available at the terminal, thus was done at the bus stop outside the terminal. Before the terminal was built, many bus services that ply the terminal used to ply at some bus stops along New Bridge Road.

In May 2016, the Government announced that a new bus terminal, Kampong Bahru Bus Terminal, which is located along Spooner Road, will replace this bus terminal as the plot of land occupied by it will be redeveloped into a new elective surgery centre by the Singapore General Hospital. The terminal ceased operations on 10 March 2018 with the opening of the new Kampong Bahru Bus Terminal.

Sin Ming Road
Sin Ming Road Bus Terminal was a bus terminal located along Sin Ming Road in Bishan New Town. Due to rapid urban development and shifting demographics, it was relegated from the main terminal serving the Sin Ming and Upper Thomson area, until the development of Bishan resulted in a reconfiguration of the urban makeup and shifted the population towards the east, where the Bishan Bus Interchange was built in the new town centre. Service 130, the only service operated by Singapore Bus Services which used to terminate at this terminal was amended to call at Ang Mo Kio Bus Interchange instead. The terminal was then handed over to the management of TIBS Holdings, which operates SSB's CSS Service 605 (formerly Service 5) to the terminal.

During the management period of SSB, SBS introduced a new feeder Service 353 (Sin Ming Road – Bishan Street 31), in 1988 to ply from Sin Ming Road to the new satellite town of Bishan. In 1989, the service was re-routed to start from Bishan Bus Interchange, renumbered as Service 57 and withdrawn subsequently.

The terminal was one of the few surviving terminals of the 1970s era in which it was common for terminals to be built along the road side with only a small booth for drivers to report when completing their runs.

Somapah
Somapah Bus Terminal was a bus terminal located near the present Singapore Expo Hall 7 carpark, at the junction of Upper Changi Road East and Simei Road. It was opened as Somapah Bus Interchange in 1982 and closed in 1989.

The terminal was originally a bus maintenance and refuelling depot owned by the then Associated Bus Company that ran two services, numbered 1 and 2, from Changi Point to the city.

Currently it is being used as a temporary storage depot for construction equipment and materials for the rapidly developing Changi Business Park, which was once Somapah Village.

Taman Jurong

Taman Jurong Bus Terminal was a roadside bus terminal located along Hu Ching Road in Taman Jurong. This is the last and latest roadside bus terminal to be built in Singapore. It opened in 2013 when the new bus service 49 was introduced from Taman Jurong to Jurong West Street 41. The terminal was also used by bus service 98A, a short trip service from Lakeside MRT Station to Corporation Rd, as a layover stop. Although the facilities were similar to Ghim Moh and Sims Place Terminals, passengers were not allowed to board or alight at Taman Jurong Terminal. On 22 November 2015, the container box office for bus captains to rest in during their break was removed as the bus service 49 was extended to Jurong East. Service 98A buses continue to layover till 2018. As of 2018, the bus bays were covered up and remains of the terminal can no longer be found.

Others

 Admiralty Road West: Situated at the junction of Admiralty Road West and Canberra Road, it was relocated to Sembawang Bus Interchange on 20 November 2005.
 Bedok Road
 Bukit Panjang: Relocated to Bukit Panjang Bus Interchange.
 Chai Chee: Relocated to Bedok Bus Interchange in 1985.
 Commonwealth Avenue: Situated at the junction of Commonwealth Avenue and North Buona Vista Road, it was converted to an open carpark in 1982.
 Crawford Street: Relocated to Lorong 1 Geylang Bus Terminal in 1998.
 Delta Road
 Holland Drive: Roadside bus lanes converted into lane for the main road.
 Jalan Eunos: Relocated to Eunos Bus Interchange in 1989.
 Labrador
 Lim Chu Kang Road End: Converted to a bus stop.
 MacPherson: Relocated to Eunos Bus Interchange in 1990.
 NTI
 Old Upper Thomson: Converted to a public car park.
 Potong Pasir
 Prince Edward Road: Relocated to Shenton Way Bus Terminal.
 Princess Elizabeth: The whole neighbourhood (Hillview) was demolished years after the closure of the terminal.
 Punggol Road End: Converted into bus bay for public buses to turn around the T junction.
 Redhill Close
 Rumah Tinggi: Now the looping point for SBS Transit Service 63, which terminated at the terminal previously.
 Sembawang (Sembawang Road; junction of Mandai Road)
 Sembawang Road End: Situated at the end of Sembawang Road where Sembawang Park is today, it was relocated to Sembawang Bus Interchange on 20 November 2005.
 Sengkang: Relocated to Sengkang Bus Interchange.
 Serangoon Gardens: Relocated to Serangoon Bus Interchange in 1987.
 Singapore Zoological Gardens: Converted to a bus stop.
 South Canal
 Tampines Avenue 5: Relocated to Tampines Bus Interchange in 1987.
 Teban Gardens (old Jurong Depot, Penjuru Road): closed on 12 May 2002 with the extension of Service 143 to Jurong East Bus Interchange. 
 Tuas (Pioneer Road)
 Ulu Pandan: Converted to a seafood restaurant, original layout retained in 1988.Bus service 188 and 61 served this terminal.
 Upper Changi
 Upper Serangoon Road End: Relocated to Hougang Central Bus Interchange in 1994.
 Yio Chu Kang Road

See also
 Bus transport in Singapore

References

Singapore
 

Bus stations, Singapore
Bus stations, former
Bus stations, former